Ivaniškiai (from the Slavic name Ivan) could refer to several Lithuanian villages:
 
 Ivaniškiai, Josvainiai, in Josvainiai Eldership of Kėdainiai District Municipality
 Ivaniškiai, Pelėdnagiai, in Pelėdnagiai Eldership of Kėdainiai District Municipality

See also 
 Ivaniškis
 Iwaniszki
 Iwaniska